Sylvia Toh Paik Choo (born 1946/1947) is a Singaporean newspaper columnist and humour writer.

Early life
Toh was born in Penang to a Hokkien-speaking family. She is the author of Eh Goondu! (1982) and Lagi Goondu! (1986), the first two books on Singlish. 

She previously wrote for The New Paper before moving to fashion website Superadrianme.

Works
 Eh Goondu! (1982, Eastern Universities Press) 
 The Pick of Paik Choo (1982, Times Books International) 
 Friendship, Courtship, Hatred, Love (1983, Times Books International) 
 Lagi Goondu! (1986, Times Books International) 
 The Original Singapore Sling Book (1986, Landmark Books) 
 On the Buses (1987, Landmark Books) 
 The Hosomes! (1994, Singapore Courtesy Council) 
 The Complete Eh, Goondu! (2011, Marshall Cavendish Editions)

References

External links 
 
 

1940s births
Living people
Year of birth missing (living people)
Singaporean people of Chinese descent
Singaporean journalists
Singaporean women journalists
Women humorists
20th-century Singaporean women writers
20th-century Singaporean writers
21st-century Singaporean women writers
People from Penang